The 1922–23 Scottish Districts season is a record of all the rugby union matches for Scotland's district teams.

History

Edinburgh District beat Glasgow District in the Inter-City match.

Results

Inter-City

Glasgow District:

Edinburgh District:

Other Scottish matches

Inverness-shire and Ross-shire: 

Aberdeenshire: 

Midlands District: Donald (Kirkcaldy); McKenzie, Muir, Wighton (Dundee HSFP), and Jenkins (captain) (Dunfermline); Craig (St Andrews University) and Wilson; Black (Dunfermline), Hobb (Dundee HSFP), Andersen, Stevenson (St Andrews University), J. H. S. Davidson, R. Bonthrone (Howe of Fife), Brackenridge (Panmure), Howie (Kirkcaldy), and Robertson (Dunfermline). 

North of Scotland District: Jarvis (Highland); McGregor, Gordon, Saunders (Aberdeen Grammar School F.P.), and Ian McLeod (Highland); Cruickshank and Sorley (captain) (Aberdeen Grammar School) ; Mclntosh, Walker (Highland), G. McLeod (Aberdeen Grammar School), Tom (Aberdeen University), Spark, Watt (Aberdeen Grammar School), Rhind (Aberdeen University), McLellan (Highland) and Strathdee (Gordonians)

North of Scotland District:

South of Scotland District:

Junior matches

South of Scotland District:

Edinburgh District:

Trial matches

Scotland Probables:

Scotland Possibles: 

Scotland Probables:

Scotland Possibles: 

Scotland Probables:

Scotland Possibles:

English matches

No other District matches played.

International matches

No touring matches this season.

References

1922–23 in Scottish rugby union
Scottish Districts seasons